Scabiosa atropurpurea (syn. Sixalix atropurpurea), the mourningbride, mournful widow, pincushion flower, or sweet scabious, is an ornamental plant of the genus Scabiosa in the family Caprifoliaceae. It is native to southern Europe.

Subtaxa
The following subtaxa are accepted:

Scabiosa atropurpurea subsp. atropurpurea
Scabiosa atropurpurea var. grandiflora 
Scabiosa atropurpurea subsp. maritima

Description
Scabiosa atropurpurea has cauline leaves that are pinnately dissected, plants have red to purple flowers. It is native to southern Europe. It propagates by seeds which are dispersed by animals.

Cultivation
It prefers cooler climates; high temperatures and humidity negatively impact its growth. Scabiosa atropurpurea grows best in rich, alkaline soils high in organic matter with good drainage. It makes a good cut flower.   
Scabiosa atropurpurea 'Beaujolais Bonnets' is a cultivar grown for its long blooming period and burgundy flowers.

Invasive species
It has become an invasive species outside of its native range, including the US state of California where it has invaded grasslands. It ranks as one of South Australia's most commonly recorded weeds.

References

Sources

atropurpurea
Plants described in 1753
Taxa named by Carl Linnaeus
Flora of Malta